Cosima is a feminine given name, the feminine version of the name Cosimo. It is derived from the Greek , meaning 'order', 'decency'. Cosmo was a fourth-century saint who was martyred with his brother Damian. They are the patron saints of medical doctors. An Italian male version of the name is Cosimo.

Masculine variants
Côme (French)
Cosimo (Italian)
Cosma (Italian)
Cosme (French), (Portuguese), (Spanish)
Cosmin (Romanian)
Cosmo (English), (German), (Italian)
Kuzma (Russian)
Kosma (Polish)

Feminine variants
Cosmina (Romanian)
Cosma
Cosme 
Kosma

People
Cosima De Vito (born 1976), Australian singer-songwriter.
Cosima Diamond, daughter of Nigella Lawson and the late John Diamond.
Cosima Littlewood, young actress who played Adèle in the 2006 mini series Jane Eyre
Cosima von Bülow Pavoncelli
Cosima Wagner (1837–1930), diarist and director of the Bayreuth Festival, daughter of Franz Liszt and widow of Richard Wagner
Lady Cosima Windsor, (born 2010), daughter of Alexander Windsor, Earl of Ulster

Fictional characters
Cosima Niehaus, one of the clones played by Tatiana Maslany in BBC America's television series Orphan Black

References

Rosenkrantz, Linda, and Satran, Pamela Redmond (2007). The Baby Names Bible. St. Martin's Griffin.